Ole Johnny Henriksen (born 29 May 1955) is a Norwegian footballer. He played in six matches for the Norway national football team from 1977 to 1981.

References

External links
 

1955 births
Living people
Norwegian footballers
Norway international footballers
Place of birth missing (living people)
Association footballers not categorized by position